List of communities in Annapolis County, Nova Scotia.

Communities are ordered by the highway upon which they are located. All routes start with the terminus located near the largest community.

Trunk Routes

Trunk 1: Wilmot - Middleton - Brickton - Lawrencetown - Paradise - Bridgetown - Upper Granville - Belleisle - Granville Centre - Granville Ferry - Annapolis Royal - Upper Clements - Clementsport - Cornwallis Park - Deep Brook
Trunk 8: Annapolis Royal - Lequille - Graywood - Milford - Maitland Bridge
Trunk 10: Middleton - Nictaux Falls - Nictaux South - New Albany - Albany Cross - Springfield

Collector Roads

Route 201: Centrelea - Tupperville - Round Hill - West Paradise - Moschelle - Carleton Corner
Route 362: Middleton - Victoria Vale - Margaretsville - East Margaretsville

Communities located on Rural Roads

Albany, Nova Scotia
Bloomington
Clarence
Clementsvale
Delap's Cove
Falkland Ridge
Greenland 
Hampton
Hastings
Hillsburn
Inglisville
Karsdale
Lake La Rose
Litchfield
Mount Hanley
Outram
Parker's Cove
Perotte
Phinney's Cove
Port George
Port Lorne
Port Royal
Port Wade
Prince Albert
South Farmington
St. Croix Cove
Torbrook
West Dalhousie
Victoria Beach
Youngs Cove
Waldeck

External links
Fundy Communities

Annapolis County